Dar Faraghat Agricultural Institute ( – Mūsaseh Felāḩet-e Dar Farāghat) is a village and agricultural institute in Kushk-e Hezar Rural District, Beyza District, Sepidan County, Fars Province, Iran. At the 2006 census, its population was 14, in 8 families.

References 

Populated places in Beyza County